The Montreal Carabins football team represents the University of Montreal in Montreal, Quebec in the sport of Canadian football in U Sports. The Carabins program has been in operation since its resurrection in the 2002 football season and has established itself as a provincial and national powerhouse with four RSEQ conference championships and one national championship since 2014.

History

The team began its second incarnation in 2002 after over thirty years of being dormant. The Carabins first began play in 1966 in the Ontario Intercollegiate Football Conference and continued play for the next six seasons. The program was dropped after the 1971 season due to a shift in philosophy as many francophone universities placed an emphasis on community involvement and intramural athletic activities as opposed to intercollegiate athletics. That philosophy has shifted back to intercollegiate sports as Université Laval, Montréal and Université de Sherbrooke each began programs in 1996, 2002 and 2003, respectively.

The current program has seen marked success in the regular season, having qualified for the playoffs in every season since 2003. However, the program had difficulty winning their conference championship in the early years, with five losses in their first five appearances. That changed under the leadership of former head coach, Danny Maciocia, in 2014, as the Carabins defeated the Laval Rouge et Or to win their first Dunsmore Cup. The team then won the national semi-final Uteck Bowl against the Manitoba Bisons to qualify for the first Vanier Cup game in program history. In the 50th Vanier Cup, the Carabins defeated the McMaster Marauders by a score of 20–19 to win the first national championship in program history.

The team won two more Dunsmore Cups in 2015 and 2019, but eventually lost in the Vanier Cup games in both seasons. Maciocia resigned following the 2019 season to join the Canadian Football League's Montreal Alouettes and was replaced by Marco Iadeluca on February 11, 2020.

In 2021, the first season after the COVID-19 pandemic, the team finished first of the regular season with a record of 7-1, and two straight wins against their rivals, the Laval Rouge et Or. They hosted the 2021 Dunsmore Cup at home, and managed to lift it in Montréal - their fourth Dunsmore Cup - following a decisive victory of 28-19 against Laval, the program's first Dunsmore Cup win at home - and finished the season with three wins against their rivals for the first time in their history.

In 2022, the team finished second in the RSEQ with a record of 6-2. They participated in their ninth straight Dunsmore Cup, and lost 24-25 in Québec, against the Rouge et Or on a single.

Season-by-season record

National award winners
Presidents' Trophy: Nicky Farinaccio (2022)
Peter Gorman Trophy: Maxime Gagnier (2003), Martin Gagné (2005)

Carabins in the CFL

As of the end of the 2022 CFL season, 14 former Carabins players are on CFL teams' rosters:
Louis-Philippe Bourassa, Ottawa Redblacks
Frédéric Chagnon, Montreal Alouettes
Régis Cibasu, Montreal Alouettes
Marc-Antoine Dequoy, Montreal Alouettes
Kerfalla Exumé, Montreal Alouettes
David Foucault, Edmonton Elks
Brian Harelimana, Montreal Alouettes
Kevin Kaya, Montreal Alouettes
Redha Kramdi, Winnipeg Blue Bombers
Pier-Olivier Lestage, Montreal Alouettes
Benoit Marion, Toronto Argonauts
David Ménard, BC Lions
Antoine Pruneau, Ottawa Redblacks
Sean Thomas Erlington, Hamilton Tiger-Cats

References

External links
 Carabins official site

 
U Sports football teams
U Sports teams in Quebec
Montreal Carabins